Ezra Darby (June 7, 1768 – January 27, 1808) was an American politician who was elected to two terms as a U.S. Representative from New Jersey, serving from 1805 to 1808.

Biography
Born in Scotch Plains, New Jersey, Darby attended the common schools. He engaged in agricultural pursuits.
Held offices as chosen freeholder, assessor, and Justice of the Peace from 1800 to 1804. He served as member of the New Jersey General Assembly from 1802 to 1804.

Darby was elected as a Democratic-Republican to the Ninth and Tenth Congresses and served from March 4, 1805, until his death in Washington, D.C., January 27, 1808. He was also a slave owner.

He was interred in Congressional Cemetery in Washington, D.C.

See also
List of United States Congress members who died in office (1790–1899)

References

External links 

1768 births
1808 deaths
Members of the New Jersey General Assembly
Burials at the Congressional Cemetery
People from Scotch Plains, New Jersey
Democratic-Republican Party members of the United States House of Representatives from New Jersey
American slave owners